The  Sandy  is a Chesapeake Bay log canoe. She is a 28'-1" long sailing log canoe with two masts and a racing rig. Log-built, with carvel-fitted rising planks, the boat has a beam of 6'-8". She is one of the last 22 surviving traditional Chesapeake Bay racing log canoes, carrying on a tradition of racing on the Eastern Shore of Maryland that has existed since the 1840s. She is located at Sherwood, Talbot County, Maryland.

She was listed on the National Register of Historic Places in 1985.

References

External links
, including photo in 1984, at Maryland Historical Trust

Ships in Talbot County, Maryland
Ships on the National Register of Historic Places in Maryland
National Register of Historic Places in Talbot County, Maryland